This article details the Huddersfield Giants rugby league football club's 2015 season. This was the 20th season of the Super League era.

Pre season friendlies

Giants score is first.

Table

2015 fixtures and results

2015 First Utility Super League

Player appearances
Super League Only

 = Injured

 = Suspended

Challenge Cup

Player appearances
Challenge Cup Games only

Playoffs

Player appearances
Play-off Games only

2015 squad statistics

 Appearances and points include (Super League, Challenge Cup and Play-offs) as of April 2015.

 = Injured
 = Suspended

2015 transfers in/out

Ins

Outs

References

External links
Huddersfield on Sky Sports
Huddersfield on Super League Site
BBC Sport-Rugby League

Huddersfield Giants seasons
Huddersfield Giants